Scopanta is a genus of beetles in the family Cerambycidae, containing the following species:

 Scopanta expansitarsis Fairmaire, 1896
 Scopanta laevipennis Fairmaire, 1896
 Scopanta rufula Fairmaire, 1893

References

Dorcasominae